William Richard Keay Thomas (born 22 July 1960) is a former English first-class cricketer who played in one match for Worcestershire against the Sri Lankans at Worcester in early July 1981. In a drawn game, he scored a useful 44 from number eight in the first innings, and made 13 not out in the second.

The game mentioned above was Thomas's only first-team outing, but he made numerous appearances for Worcestershire's Second XI, on one occasion in 1980 taking 7/72 against Yorkshire II.

Notes

References

English cricketers
Worcestershire cricketers
1960 births
Living people
Sportspeople from Redditch